Tozzo is an Italian surname. Notable people with the surname include:

Andrea Tozzo (born 1992), Italian footballer
Rocco Tozzo (1893–1954), Italian-American boxer better known as Rocky Kansas

See also
Tozzi

Italian-language surnames